Goniodoris barroisi is a species of sea slug, a dorid nudibranch, a marine gastropod mollusc in the family Goniodorididae.

Distribution
This species was first described from the Gulf of Marseille, France by A Vayssière in 1901. Harmless to humans it is found in sub tropical areas including the Mediterranean sea.

References

Goniodorididae
Gastropods described in 1901